New York Yacht, Launch & Engine Company was a shipyard located on the Harlem River in the Morris Heights neighborhood of the Bronx.

History
The New York Yacht, Launch & Engine Company was active from 1903 until 1931. They built power boats for private owners and smaller ships for the U.S. Navy and U.S. Coast Guard. In 1917 and 1918, they built 30 of the 110-foot SC-1-class submarine chasers for the U.S. Navy (numbered SC-223 through SC-242 and SC-393 through SC-402). In 1919, they built 5 of the 88-foot YT-46-class harbor tugs for the U.S. Navy (numbered YT-77 through YT-81).  In 1924 and 1925, they built ten 75-foot patrol boats for the U.S. Coast Guard (numbered CG-160 through CG-169) which were used during Prohibition to intercept rumrunners.

Gallery

References

American boat builders
Defunct shipbuilding companies of the United States
 
Defunct manufacturing companies based in New York City
American companies established in 1903
Manufacturing companies established in 1903
American companies disestablished in 1931
Manufacturing companies disestablished in 1931
Morris Heights, Bronx